Affinity Living Circle Square is a  tall, 36-storey residential skyscraper in Manchester, England. The building is part of the Circle Square development area of the city centre on Oxford Road, consisting of commercial buildings, student residential, private rented residential, retail and leisure space. 

It was designed by Feilden Clegg Bradley Studios and as of 2023 is the 11th-tallest building in Greater Manchester.

History

Planning
The planning application was submitted to Manchester City Council in April 2016 for 411 apartments in one part 17-storey, part 36-storey tower, 266 apartments within one 17-storey tower, two office towers of 18- and 14-storeys, and a 10-storey car park with more than 1,000 spaces.

Planning approval was obtained in June 2016.

Construction
Construction of Affinity Living Circle Square commenced in 2018 and completed in 2021.

Facilities
Affinity Living Circle Square includes a gym, private dining rooms, residents' lounges, co-working spaces, and rooftop terraces.

See also
List of tallest buildings in the United Kingdom
List of tallest buildings and structures in Greater Manchester

References

Buildings and structures in Manchester
2021 establishments in England
Skyscrapers in Manchester
Residential skyscrapers in England
Apartment buildings in England
Residential buildings completed in 2021
Residential buildings in Manchester